Izmaylovskoye Municipal Okrug is a municipal okrug of Admiralteysky District of the federal city of St. Petersburg, Russia. Population:  

It borders the Fontanka River in the north, Moskovsky Avenue in the east, Malaya Mitrofanevskaya Street in the south, and Mitrofanevskoye Highway and Lermontovsky Avenue in the west.

Places of interest include Warsaw Rail Terminal and the Trinity Cathedral.

References

Admiralteysky District, Saint Petersburg